Lawrence Hall is a theoretical particle physicist and professor at the University of California, Berkeley and the Berkeley Center for Theoretical Physics.

Biography 
Hall received his bachelor's degree from Oxford in 1977 and his Ph.D. from Harvard in 1981 with Howard Georgi. He was a Miller Fellow at Berkeley and an assistant professor at Harvard where he was a Sloan Foundation Fellow, before becoming professor at Berkeley in 1983, where he won a Presidential Young Investigator Award.

Hall is notable for his theoretical contributions to a wide span of research topics such as physics beyond the Standard Model, including supersymmetry and dark matter, in addition to his work on the weak force, cosmology, and grand unified theories. He was named a Fellow of the American Physical Society in 1993 "for numerous original contributions to the phenomenology of weak interaction, supersymmetry and supergravity, and the physics of the early universe."

His doctoral students include Nima Arkani-Hamed, Neil Weiner, and Hsin-Chia Cheng.

References 

Particle physicists
University of California, Berkeley faculty
Theoretical physicists
American physicists
21st-century American physicists
Harvard University faculty
Alumni of the University of Oxford
Harvard University alumni
Year of birth missing (living people)
Living people
Fellows of the American Physical Society